Margh (also Romanized as Morgh; also known as Margh-e Kūhestān and Marq) is a village in Borkhar-e Sharqi Rural District, Habibabad District, Borkhar County, Isfahan Province, Iran. At the 2006 census, its population was 251, in 69 families.

References 

Populated places in Borkhar County